The 2015–16 Harvard Crimson men's basketball team represented Harvard University during the 2015–16 NCAA Division I men's basketball season. The Crimson, led by ninth year head coach Tommy Amaker, played their home games at Lavietes Pavilion and were members of the Ivy League. They finished the season 14–16, 6–8 in Ivy League play to finish in fourth place.

Previous season 
The Crimson finished the season 22–8, 11–3 in Ivy League play to share to the regular season Ivy League title with Yale. They earned the Ivy League's automatic bid to the NCAA Tournament after defeating Yale in a One-game playoff, the ninth one-game playoff tie breaker in Ivy League history. In the NCAA Tournament, the Crimson lost to North Carolina in the second round.

Departures

Recruiting class of 2015

Class of 2016

Roster

Schedule

|-
!colspan=9 style="background:#991111; color:#FFFFFF;"| Exhibition

|-
!colspan=9 style="background:#991111; color:#FFFFFF;"| Regular season

Source:

References

Harvard Crimson men's basketball seasons
Harvard
Harvard Crimson men's basketball
Harvard Crimson men's basketball
Harvard Crimson men's basketball
Harvard Crimson men's basketball